Club de Fútbol Trujillo is a Spanish football team based in Trujillo, in the autonomous community of Extremadura. Founded in 1942, it plays in Tercera División – Group 14, holding home games at Estadio Municipal de Trujillo.

Season to season

7 seasons in Tercera División

References

External links

fexfutbol.com profile
Futbolme.com profile

Football clubs in Extremadura
Association football clubs established in 1942
Divisiones Regionales de Fútbol clubs
1942 establishments in Spain
Province of Cáceres